John W. Miller was a Scottish amateur footballer who played as a goalkeeper in the Scottish League for Queen's Park. He was capped by Scotland at amateur level.

References 

Scottish footballers
Scottish Football League players
Queen's Park F.C. players
Association football goalkeepers
Scotland amateur international footballers
Year of birth missing
Place of birth missing
Pollok F.C. players